Julia Farrugia Portelli is a Maltese politician, currently serving as Minister for Inclusion and Social Wellbeing.

About
She was elected from the 5th district at the 2017 general election on the Labour Party ticket, and served as Parliamentary Secretary for Reforms, Citizenship and Simplification of Administrative Processes at the Office of the Prime Minister between 9 June 2017 and 13 January 2020. As Parliamentary Secretary she was involved with reforms including: Human Trafficking, Constitutional Reform and Equal Representation in Parliament. She served as a member of the Public Accounts Committee of the Maltese Parliament.

In 2018, Portelli was awarded the ‘Impactful Politics’ Awards from JCI Malta. She has successfully implemented the VOTE16 reform, where Malta is now one of two European Union Member states that have lowered their voting age to 16. With the election of Robert Abela as Prime Minister of Malta, Portelli was appointed Minister for Tourism and Consumer Protection on 15 January 2020. Portelli is a former journalist and anchor of a number of current affairs and investigative journalism programmes. She was also the first female editor of a Maltese language newspaper, Illum.

Breach of Standards in Public Life  
In 2020, The Commissioner for Standards in Public Life found that Farrugia Portelli may have given an improper advantage to a private firm selling citizenship by investment schemes. Minister Farrugia Portelli, who at the time was a Parliamentary Secretary with responsibility for these schemes, appeared in all three videos together with officials from the government agencies that administer the schemes and representatives of the law firm itself. All three videos were shot in Castille. The Commissioner held that “there is a fine line between promoting a Government scheme and giving preferential treatment to a particular agent. In my opinion, this line has been crossed in the case under consideration.”

Notes 

Living people
Labour Party (Malta) politicians
Women government ministers of Malta
Maltese journalists
Maltese women journalists
Members of the House of Representatives of Malta
Government ministers of Malta
21st-century Maltese women politicians
21st-century Maltese politicians
Year of birth missing (living people)